Lukáš Lacko was the defending champion but retired in the final round of qualifying in his match against Daniil Glinka.

Luca Nardi won the title after defeating Zizou Bergs 7–6(7–2), 3–6, 7–5 in the final.

Seeds

Draw

Finals

Top half

Bottom half

References

External links
Main draw
Qualifying draw

Rafa Nadal Open - 1